The Rule Breakers is a book by Indian author Preeti Shenoy. The book was published by Westland Books in September 2018.

References

External links 
 Book on Goodreads

2018 Indian novels
Westland Books books